Port Lincoln is  a city in South Australia.

Port Lincoln may refer to:

Port Lincoln Airport
Port Lincoln Football League, an Australian rules football league
Port Lincoln Prison
Port Lincoln Times, a newspaper
City of Port Lincoln, a local government area

See also

Lincoln (disambiguation)